Nastya is a 1993 Russian comedy film directed by Georgy Daneliya.

Plot 
Anastasia Plotnikova (Nastya)   a kind, modest, inconspicuous girl   lives with a constantly ill mother, a janitor, who dreams of finally seeing her daughter with her beloved boyfriend. But this dream still does not come true. Somehow Nastya helped an unfamiliar grandmother: she was driving around the city on a bicycle in the middle of the night, and the wheel of her vehicle fell into a sewer well. The grateful old woman promised the savior to fulfill her two cherished desires. And Nastya wanted to become beautiful. After that, the girl's life changes dramatically, men are fascinated by her. But this, alas, does not bring happiness. And only when Nastya makes a second wish: to become the same as before, does she find her true love.

Cast 
 Polina Kutepova as Nastya
 Irina Markova as Nastya after transformation
 Valery Nikolaev as Aleksandr Pichugin
 Yevgeny Leonov as Yakov Alekseevich
 Aleksandr Abdulov as Teterin
 Galina Petrova as Antonina Plotnikova
 Nina Ter-Osipyan as Enchantress
 Natalya Shchukina as Valya
 Olga Nedovodina-Finney as Katya (as Olga Nedovodina)
 Aleksandr Potapov as Maksim Petrovich
 Nina Grebeshkova as Teterin's secretary
 Norbert Kuchinke as foreign journalist
 Yuli Gusman as show host
 Savely Kramarov as burglar thief
 Leonid Yarmolnik as a passer-by with a hat
 Roman Madyanov as Morgunin
 Aleksandr Adabashyan as a representative of the ministry of culture
 Yuri Rost as  TV man
 Georgy Danelia as cultural worker

Awards and nominations 
 1994 —  Nika Award
 Nominated for Best Sound Editing (Valentin Bobrovsky)

References

External links 
 

1993 films
1990s Russian-language films
Russian romantic comedy films
Remakes of Russian films
1993 romantic comedy films
Films directed by Georgiy Daneliya
Body swapping in films
Mosfilm films